Olleros de Tera is a locality in Calzadilla de Tera,  Zamora province, Castile and León, Spain.  it had a population of 179.

References

Populated places in the Province of Zamora
Localities of Spain